Diestrammena is a 'camel' or 'cave-cricket' genus in the family Rhaphidophoridae. Species in the genus are native to Asia, including Japan.

Note: this genus should not be confused with the similarly-named Diestramima which also belongs to the subfamily Aemodogryllinae.

Species 
The Orthoptera Species File includes two subgenera and lists:
subgenus Aemodogryllus Adelung, 1902 - Japan
Diestrammena brunneri Adelung, 1902
Diestrammena davidi Sugimoto & Ichikawa, 2003
Diestrammena elegantissima Griffini, 1912
Diestrammena goliath Bey-Bienko, 1929
Diestrammena hisanorum Sugimoto & Ichikawa, 2003
Diestrammena itodo Sugimoto & Ichikawa, 2003
Diestrammena nicolai Gorochov, 2002
Diestrammena robusta Ander, 1932
Diestrammena taniusagi Sugimoto & Ichikawa, 2003
Diestrammena taramensis Sugimoto & Ichikawa, 2003
Diestrammena tsushimensis Storozhenko, 1990
Diestrammena yakumontana Sugimoto & Ichikawa, 2003
subgenus Diestrammena Brunner von Wattenwyl, 1888 - China, Japan, Indo-China and Sulawesi
Diestrammena annandalel Griffini, 1915
Diestrammena gigas Sugimoto & Ichikawa, 2003
Diestrammena griffinii Chopard, 1916
Diestrammena heinrichi Ramme, 1943
Diestrammena indica Chopard, 1921
Diestrammena inexpectata Sugimoto & Ichikawa, 2003
Diestrammena ingens Karny, 1915
Diestrammena iriomotensis Gorochov, 2002
Diestrammena japanica Blatchley, 1920 - type species (as Locusta marmorata Haan)
Diestrammena kurilensis Storozhenko, 1990
Diestrammena palliceps Walker, 1869
Diestrammena unicolor Brunner von Wattenwyl, 1888

Now placed in Tachycines or superseded
Diestrammena asynamora Adelung, 1902
Diestrammena bifurcata Gorochov, 2010
Diestrammena caudata Gorochov, Rampini & di Russo, 2006
Diestrammena crenata di Russo & Rampini, 2005
Diestrammena ferecaeca Gorochov, Rampini & di Russo, 2006
Diestrammena improvisa Gorochov, 2010
Diestrammena kabaki Gorochov, 2010
Diestrammena omninocaeca Gorochov, Rampini & di Russo, 2006
Diestrammena ovalilobata Gorochov, 2010
Diestrammena semicrenata Gorochov, Rampini & di Russo, 2006
Diestrammena solida Gorochov, Rampini & di Russo, 2006
Diestrammena tonkinensis Chopard, 1929

References

External links

Ensifera genera
Rhaphidophoridae
Cave insects
Taxa named by Carl Brunner von Wattenwyl